The 2022 Ladies Open Hechingen was a professional tennis tournament played on outdoor clay courts. It was the twenty-second edition of the tournament which was part of the 2022 ITF Women's World Tennis Tour. It took place in Hechingen, Germany between 1 and 7 August 2022.

Champions

Singles

  Lea Bošković def.  Noma Noha Akugue, 7–5, 3–6, 6–4

Doubles

  Irina Khromacheva /  Diana Shnaider def.  Tamara Čurović /  Chiara Scholl, 6–2, 6–3

Singles main draw entrants

Seeds

 1 Rankings are as of 25 July 2022.

Other entrants
The following players received wildcards into the singles main draw:
  Noma Noha Akugue
  Ella Seidel
  Joëlle Steur
  Alexandra Vecic

The following player received entry into the singles main draw using a protected ranking:
  Jessica Pieri

The following players received entry from the qualifying draw:
  Kathleen Kanev
  Julia Middendorf
  Tayisiya Morderger
  Victoria Muntean
  Sapfo Sakellaridi
  Chiara Scholl
  Julia Terziyska
  Vivian Wolff

References

External links
 2022 Ladies Open Hechingen at ITFtennis.com
 Official website

2022
2022 ITF Women's World Tennis Tour
2022 in German tennis
August 2022 sports events in Germany